Clay Township is one of eleven townships in Atchison County, Missouri, United States. As of the 2010 census, its population was 1,798.

Clay Township was organized in 1856, and named after Henry Clay of Kentucky.

Geography
It contains five cemeteries: Bush, Green Hill, Hunter, Millsap and Smith.

The streams of Boney Branch, Turkey Creek and Volger Branch run through this township.

Transportation
Clay Township contains one airport, Luhrs Landing Strip.

References

 USGS Geographic Names Information System (GNIS)

External links
 US-Counties.com
 City-Data.com

Townships in Atchison County, Missouri
Townships in Missouri